Airwaves is a compilation album by Ike & Tina Turner, released on United Artists Records in 1978, the year their divorce was finalized. It features previously unreleased recordings and alternative versions of non-album tracks that the duo released in the 1960s, including the first single credited to Tina Turner, "Too Many Ties That Bind." The album was reissued by BGO Records on the compilation CD Delilah's Power/Airwaves in 2011.

Track listing

References 

1978 albums
Ike & Tina Turner albums
United Artists Records albums
Albums produced by Ike Turner